We Will All Go to Paris (French: Nous irons à Paris) is a 1950 French comedy film directed by Jean Boyer. The film stars Ray Ventura, Philippe Lemaire and Françoise Arnoul.

Cast

References

Bibliography 
 A Companion to Contemporary French Cinema. John Wiley & Sons, 2015.

External links 
 

1950 films
French comedy films
1950 comedy films
1950s French-language films
Films directed by Jean Boyer
French black-and-white films
1950s French films